Duke McKenzie  (born 5 May 1963) is a British former professional boxer who competed from 1982 to 1998. He is a three-weight world champion, having held the IBF flyweight title from 1988 to 1989; the WBO bantamweight title from 1991 to 1992; and the WBO junior-featherweight title from 1992 to 1993. At regional level he held the British flyweight title from 1985 to 1988; the European flyweight title from 1986 to 1988; and the British featherweight title from 1993 to 1994. After retiring from the sport, McKenzie has worked as a boxing commentator for broadcaster ITV.

Professional career
Previously a highly successful professional boxer, McKenzie has been British champion at two weights, a European champion once and world champion at three different weights.  His professional record is 39-7 (20 by KO).

Flyweight
He won the British flyweight title (5 June 1985) with a fourth round stoppage over Danny Flynn.  He later defended this against Charlie Magri (20 May 1986) and added Magri's European flyweight title.

Both titles were relinquished when McKenzie won the IBF flyweight Title on 5 October 1988 with an 11th-round knockout over Rolando Bohol.

After two title defences and one non-title, McKenzie lost the IBF flyweight title to Dave McAuley on 7 June 1989 in his first defeat.

Bantamweight
An unsuccessful challenge for the European (EBU) Bantamweight title on 30 September 1990 saw McKenzie lose to Thierry Jacob of France.

On 30 June 1991 McKenzie became a world champion for a second time, winning the WBO bantamweight title with a 12-round decision over Gaby Canizales.  This was lost to Rafael Del Valle on 13 May 1992 when McKenzie suffered his first knockout loss, in the first round.

Super bantamweight
On 15 October 1992 McKenzie became a three-weight world champion, beating Jesse Benavides after twelve rounds for the WBO Super Bantamweight title.  On 9 June 1993, Daniel Jimenez beat McKenzie on points, in his first defence of this title.

Featherweight
On 18 December 1993 McKenzie became a four-weight regional champion, beating John Davison for the British Featherweight title.  An attempt to become world champion at this division ended in a knockout loss to Steve Robinson on 1 October 1994.  McKenzie's next fight was an unsuccessful challenge for Mehdi Labdouni's  European featherweight title.

McKenzie's last fight, in March 1998, saw him lose in farcical circumstances in the first round to 4-4 Santiago Rojas.

Life after boxing
He previously commentated on boxing for BBC Radio Five Live and BBC television with John Rawling. He joined ITV with Rawling when boxing returned to the network in September 2005. He has also broadcast for BoxNation, Primetime and Al Jazeera. He also runs a flourishing gymnasium in Purley.

Personal life
He is the brother of former British and European champion Clinton McKenzie, and former amateur boxer and politician Winston McKenzie. On 4 March 1989, Duke witnessed the Purley station rail crash, and was amongst those who helped in the aftermath.

Professional boxing record

See also
List of British world boxing champions
List of world flyweight boxing champions
List of world bantamweight boxing champions
List of world super-bantamweight boxing champions
List of boxing triple champions

References

External links

|-

|-

1963 births
Living people
English male boxers
People from Croydon
Sportspeople from Surrey
Boxers from Greater London
Members of the Order of the British Empire
British Boxing Board of Control champions
European Boxing Union champions
International Boxing Federation champions
World Boxing Organization champions
World flyweight boxing champions
World bantamweight boxing champions
World super-bantamweight boxing champions